Henry Peyton Cobb (19 October 1835 – 27 January 1910) was an English banker, solicitor and Liberal politician.

Cobb was born in Banbury, Oxfordshire, the son of Timothy Rhodes Cobb and his wife Charlotte, née Pix. His father was a partner the family in girth-weaving business and in Cobbs' Bank in Banbury. His father was also a Unitarian and Cobb was baptised at the Horse Fair Presbyterian chapel. He became a partner in the family bank and a solicitor in London, where he lived at Wealdstone House Harrow on the Hill, Middlesex. 
 
In 1885 Cobb was elected as member of parliament for Rugby. He held the seat until 1895.

Cobb died at the age of 74.

He married Frances Taylor. His son John Henry married Ellen Beatrice Jaques, daughter of John Jaques II, of Jaques of London. He was also the grandfather of Michael Cobb (railway historian). He married Elizabeth Sharpe as his second wife in 1872. His daughter Mildred married Balthazar Foster, 2nd Baron Ilkeston.

Coat of arms : Per chevron gules and sables, two shovellers in chief argent, and a fish naiant in base. Crest: an elephant passant, or.

Motto : Spectemur agendo

References

External links
 

1835 births
1910 deaths
Liberal Party (UK) MPs for English constituencies
UK MPs 1885–1886
UK MPs 1886–1892
UK MPs 1892–1895
People from Banbury